Stanley Potato House is a historic potato house located near Laurel, Sussex County, Delaware, United States. It is one of the last surviving examples of its building type.  It was built about 1920, and is a -story, gable fronted, balloon frame structure on a brick foundation. It measures 17 feet by 23 feet. It retains a number of important elements characteristic of potato house including: minimal fenestration, center aisle floor plan, double siding, and hatched loading doors.

It was placed on the National Register of Historic Places in 1990.

References

Agricultural buildings and structures on the National Register of Historic Places in Delaware
Government buildings completed in 1920
Buildings and structures in Sussex County, Delaware
Potato houses in Delaware
Laurel, Delaware
National Register of Historic Places in Sussex County, Delaware